The large-eared horseshoe bat (Rhinolophus philippinensis) is a species of bat in the family Rhinolophidae. It is found in Australia, Indonesia, Malaysia, Papua New Guinea, and the Philippines.

References

Rhinolophidae
Bats of Oceania
Bats of Southeast Asia
Bats of Australia
Bats of Indonesia
Mammals of Papua New Guinea
Mammals of Western New Guinea
Mammals of the Philippines
Mammals of Queensland
Mammals described in 1843
Nature Conservation Act endangered biota
Taxonomy articles created by Polbot
Taxa named by George Robert Waterhouse
Bats of New Guinea